Seyyed Reza "Afshin" Chavoshi (born 17 September 1984, Rasht) is an Iranian football player of Damash Gilan. He plays as a striker.

Club career 
In 2001, he was called up to Esteghlal Rasht from the youth team by Nasser Hejazi when he was 17 years old. Chavoshi scored his first goal in Iran Pro League in 2–0 win over Aboomoslem in the same season. The following season relegating to Azadegan League and dissolution of Esteghlal Rasht he played next season in a new team Pegah. He was transferred to Malavan in 2003–04 season because of army services but didn't play a single game due injury. He returned to Pegah in 2004 and continued his career with this team until October 2008 when Pegah was sold to Damash Iranian (Damash Mineral Water Company) due financial problems and Chavohsi played in a new team Damash Gilan in 2009–10 season. He had very good time with Damash In 2009–10 season he scored 15 goals and became the 4th best goal-scorer of the league but Despite having a good season and score many goals, Damash was relegated to first division and Chavoshi was transferred to Steel Azin. After playing one season at Steel Azin he moved back to Damash in 2010 and help the team to promote back to Iran Pro League he also became top goal scorer of season. On last days of December 2013 he made a 3 months deal with Aluminium until end of 2013–14 Azadegan League.

Famous match 
On April 11, 2008 he played one of his memorial matches for Pegah against Esteghlal Tehran in Azadi Stadium which he scored and assist twice. Pegah was able to beat Esteghlal 4 to 1 and this is one of the worst lost in Esteghlal's club history.

Club career statistics

 Assist Goals

International career
In 2005, he was called up for Iran national under-23 football team.

References

Iran Pro League Stats

External links

Living people
Iranian footballers
Persian Gulf Pro League players
Azadegan League players
Malavan players
Pegah Gilan players
Damash Gilan players
Steel Azin F.C. players
People from Rasht
1984 births
Association football forwards
Sportspeople from Gilan province